Smic, Smac, Smoc is a film directed by Claude Lelouch in 1971.

Synopsis
Three businessmen are best friends until one of them gets married.

Details
 Title: Smic, Smac, Smoc
 Director: Claude Lelouch
 Script: Claude Lelouch, Pierre Uytterhoeven 
 Writers: Claude Lelouch, Pierre Uytterhoeven
 Music: Francis Lai
 Song by Charles Trenet
 Assistant director: Claude Pinoteau 
 Director of photography: Claude Lelouch
 Cameramen: Daniel Vigne, Dany Lévy 
 Lighting director: Jean Collomb
 Sound engineer: Bernard Bats
 Gaffer: Bernard Rochut
 Chief editor: Jeanine Boublil
 Assistant editor: Martine Lévy
 Production director: Pierre Pardon
 Press officer: Arlette Godon
 Runners: Alain Basnier, Élie Chouraqui
 Format: Colour (Eastmancolor) – 1:37.1 – 35mm
 Length: 90 minutes
 Release date: 1971

Starring
 Catherine Allégret: Catherine
 Amidou: Robert, dit « Smoc »
 Charles Gérard: Charlot, dit « Smic »
 Jean Collomb: Jeannot, dit « Smac »
 Francis Lai: L'accordéoniste aveugle
 Pierre Uytterhoeven: Le pompiste
 Arlette Gordon: Zelda, la prostituée
 Claude Pinoteau: Le commissaire
 Claude Lelouch: Un voyou

Awards
Official selection of the Venice Film Festival 
Official selection of the San Francisco Film Festival

External links
 

1971 films
1971 comedy films
French comedy films
Films directed by Claude Lelouch
1970s French films